Veromessor is a genus of ants in the subfamily Myrmicinae. The genus was previously classified as a synonym of Messor, but was revived as a genus by Ward et al. (2015).

Species
Veromessor andrei (Mayr, 1886)
Veromessor chamberlini Wheeler, 1915
Veromessor chicoensis Smith, 1956
Veromessor julianus (Pergande, 1894)
Veromessor lariversi Smith, 1951
Veromessor lobognathus (Andrews, 1916)
Veromessor pergandei (Mayr, 1886)
Veromessor smithi Cole, 1963
Veromessor stoddardi (Emery, 1895)

References

Myrmicinae
Ant genera